Isaac Edwin Crary (October 2, 1804 – May 8, 1854) was an American politician. He was the first elected U.S. Representative from the state of Michigan.

Early life
Crary was born in Preston, Connecticut, where he attended the public schools and graduated from Trinity College, Hartford, in its first class in 1827. He studied law, was admitted to the bar, and commenced practice in Hartford. During this time he was also assistant editor of the New England Weekly Review. He moved to Marshall, Michigan, in 1833.

Career
Crary was a delegate to the state constitutional convention in 1835 and upon the admission of Michigan as a state into the Union, he was elected on October 5 and 6, 1835, as a Jacksonian to the Twenty-fourth Congress. Due to Michigan’s dispute with Ohio over the Toledo Strip (see the Toledo War), Congress refused to accept his credentials and he was seated as a delegate until Congress admitted Michigan as a state of the Union on January 26, 1837.  He was re-elected as a Democrat to the Twenty-fifth and Twenty-sixth Congresses, and served until March 3, 1841.

In 1840, during the William Henry Harrison 1840 presidential campaign, on February 14, 1840, as the House of Representatives debated funding for the Cumberland Road, Crary essayed an attack on Harrison's record as an Indian fighter, deeming him a bogus hero. Crary sat down to applause from his fellow Democrats. The next day, Ohio's Thomas Corwin, known as a humorist, rose in the House, and depicted Crary, a militia general in his home state, having to deal with the terrors of the militia's parade day, until afterwards, safe with the survivors, "your general unsheathes his trenchant blade... and with an energy and remorseless fury he slices the watermelons that lie in heaps around him." According to longtime Washington journalist Benjamin Perley Poore, Corwin's response to Crary was "one of the most wonderful speeches ever delivered at Washington," leaving the House "convulsed with laughter" at Crary's expense. As word of Corwin's speech reached newspapers in February and March, there was much amusement across the nation; Crary failed to be renominated to Congress.

He served as regent of the University of Michigan from 1837 to 1844, and with John D. Pierce wrote the education article of the 1835 constitution. Crary was appointed a member of the State board of education from 1820 to 1852. Crary and Pierce planned Michigan's public school system and established a separate department of education run by a superintendent, introducing uniform schooling in Michigan.

He was editor of the Marshall Expounder for several years and a member of the Michigan House of Representatives from 1842 to 1846, serving as speaker of the house in 1846.

Death
Crary died in Marshall, Michigan and is interred at Oakridge Cemetery in Marshall.

Legacy
Isaac E. Crary Elementary School in Detroit, Michigan and Isaac E. Crary Middle School in Waterford, Michigan were named in his honor.

References

Further reading
Historic Michigan, land of the Great Lakes; its life, resources, industries, people, politics, government, wars, institutions, achievements, the press, schools and churches, legendary and prehistoric lore.  Fuller, George N. ed. (George Newman), 1873-1957. [Dayton, Ohio] National Historical Association [1924]. p. 350

External links
 

The Political Graveyard
Miochmarkers.com: Isaac Crary and John Pierce / State School System

1804 births
1854 deaths
Speakers of the Michigan House of Representatives
Democratic Party members of the Michigan House of Representatives
Regents of the University of Michigan
People from Marshall, Michigan
People from Preston, Connecticut
Michigan Jacksonians
Democratic Party members of the United States House of Representatives from Michigan
Burials in Michigan
Delegates to the 1835 Michigan Constitutional Convention
19th-century American politicians
Trinity College (Connecticut) alumni